Ennio Morricone, OMRI (10 November 1928 – 6 July 2020) was an Italian composer, orchestrator, conductor, and trumpet player who wrote music in a wide range of styles. He composed over 400 scores for cinema and television, as well as over 100 classical works. His best-known compositions include "The Ecstasy of Gold", "Se telefonando", "Man with a Harmonica", "Here's to You", the UK No. 2 single "Chi Mai", "Gabriel's Oboe" and "E Più Ti Penso". In 1971, he received a "Targa d'Oro" for worldwide sales of 22 million, and by 2016 Morricone had sold over 70 million records worldwide. In 2007, he received the Academy Honorary Award "for his magnificent and multifaceted contributions to the art of film music." He was nominated for a further six Oscars, and in 2016, received his only competitive Academy Award for his score to Quentin Tarantino's film The Hateful Eight, at the time becoming the oldest person ever to win a competitive Oscar. His other achievements include three Grammy Awards, three Golden Globes, six BAFTAs, ten David di Donatello, eleven Nastro d'Argento, two European Film Awards, the Golden Lion Honorary Award and the Polar Music Prize in 2010. Morricone has influenced many artists from film scoring to other styles and genres, including Hans Zimmer, Danger Mouse, Dire Straits, Muse, Metallica, and Radiohead.

Academy Awards 

Morricone received his first Academy Award nomination in 1979 for the score to Days of Heaven (Terrence Malick, 1978).

Eight years later, Morricone received his second Oscar nomination for The Mission. He also received Oscar nominations for his scores to The Untouchables (1987), Bugsy (1991), Malèna (2000), and The Hateful Eight (2016). In February 2016, Morricone won his first and only competitive Academy Award for his score to The Hateful Eight.

Morricone and Alex North are the only composers to receive the Academy Honorary Award since its introduction in 1928. He received the award in February 2007, "for his magnificent and multifaceted contributions to the art of film music." In conjunction with the honor, Morricone released a tribute album, We All Love Ennio Morricone, that included as its centerpiece Celine Dion's rendition of "I Knew I Loved You" (based on "Deborah's Theme" from Once Upon a Time in America), which she performed at the ceremony. Behind-the-scenes studio production and recording footage of "I Knew I Loved You" can be viewed in the debut episode of the QuincyJones.com Podcast. The lyric, as with his Love Affair, had been written by Alan and Marilyn Bergman. Morricone's acceptance speech was in his native Italian tongue and was interpreted by Clint Eastwood.

American Film Institute

In 2005 four film scores by Ennio Morricone were nominated by the American Film Institute for an honoured place in the AFI's Top 25 of Best American Film Scores of All Time. His score for The Mission was ranked 23rd in the Top 25 list.

Golden Globe
9 Nominations, 3 Wins.

Globo d'oro (Italian Golden Globes)

Grammy Awards

Morricone was nominated seven times for a Grammy Award. In 2009 The Recording Academy inducted his score for The Good, the Bad and the Ugly (1966) into the Grammy Hall of Fame.

Nastro d'Argento (Silver Ribbon)

ASCAP Awards

BAFTA Awards
British Academy Awards: 6 Wins.

César Awards

David di Donatello

European Film Awards

Los Angeles Film Critics Association

Selected other awards 

 1967: Diapason d'Or
 1969: Premio Spoleto Cinema
 1972: Cork Film International for La califfa
 1979: Premio Vittorio de Sica
 1981: Premio della critica discografica for Il prato
 1984: Premio Zurlini
 1986: Premio Vittorio de Sica
 1988: Ninth Annual Ace Winner for Il Giorno prima
 1989: Pardo d'Oro alla carriera Locarno Film Festival
 1990: Prix Fondation Sacem del XLIII Cannes Film Festival for Nuovo Cinema Paradiso
 1992: Pentagramma d'oro
 1992: Premio Michelangelo
 1992: Grolla d'oro, alla carriera (Saint Vincent)
 1993: Efebo d'Argento for Jonas che visse nella balena
 1993: Gran Premio SACEM audiovisivi
 1994: ASCAP Golden Soundtrack Award (Los Angeles)
 1994: 7 d'Or, "Best Music" for La piovra, 
 1995: Premio Rota
 1995: Golden Lion Honorary Award by the Venice Film Festival
 1996: Premio città di Roma
 1996: Premio Cappelli
 1996: Premio Accademia di Santa Cecilia
 1997: Premio Flaiano
 1998: Columbus Prize
 1999: Erich Wolfgang Korngold Internationaler Preis für Film
 2000: Honorary Degree by the University of Cagliari
 2001: Mikeldi de Honor at "Zinebi – International Festival of Documentary and Short Films" of Bilbao
 2002: Honorary Degree by the "Seconda Università" of Rome
 2003: Golden Eagle Award by the Russian National Academy of Motion Pictures Arts and Sciences of Russia for 72 Meters (film)
 2003: Honorary Senator of the Filmscoring Class of the Hochschule für Musik und Theater München
 2006: Grand Officer OMRI, nominated by Carlo Azeglio Ciampi
 2007: The Film & TV Music Award for Lifetime Achievement
 2008: Pablo Neruda Order of Artistic and Cultural Merit, Chile's highest award for the arts
 2008: Knight of the Legion of Honour
 2009: Medal of Merits for Macedonia
 2009: America Award of the Italy–USA Foundation
 2010: Polar Music Prize of the Royal Swedish Academy of the Arts
 2012: Per Artem ad Deum Medal
 2013: Special Award for Career Achievement at the Online Film Critics Society Awards
 2013: Honoris Causa honorary academic degree at New Bulgarian University
 2016: Star on the Hollywood Walk of Fame in the category of Live Performance/Theatre.
 2019: Pontifical Gold Medal from Pope Francis, presented by Cardinal Gianfranco Ravasi
 2020: Camille Award
 2020: Princess of Asturias Award in the category of Arts

References

Awards
Morricone, Ennio